Leslie William Downes (19 September 1945 – 9 November 2019) was a New Zealand first-class cricketer who played for Central Districts in 1975–76.

Downes was born in Lower Hutt, New Zealand. He was a wicketkeeper-batsman who had a long career for Manawatu in the Hawke Cup from 1965 to 1980, captaining the team for many years, but he played only one season for Central Districts. He had an outstanding match against Canterbury at Nelson, taking six catches in Canterbury's first innings and making his highest score of 89 not out in Central Districts’ second innings.

Downes also played soccer for Manawatu. He coached cricket and soccer and served on the Manawatu cricket and soccer associations. He worked in insurance, investment, marketing and real estate.

References

External links

Les Downes at CricketArchive

1945 births
2019 deaths
People from Lower Hutt
New Zealand cricketers
New Zealand cricket coaches
Central Districts cricketers